Super-insulation systems may refer to:
 Superinsulation, for houses
 Multi-layer insulation, for spacecraft